The Philadelphia Barrage played their seventh season, as a charter member of the MLL (originally known as the Bridgeport Barrage), during the 2007 season of Major League Lacrosse. The Barrage won their 2nd Eastern Conference Championship during the regular season with a 1st place record of 9-3.  The Barrage qualified for the MLL Playoffs for the third time in franchise history.  The Barrage defeated the Outlaws 13-12 in OT in the MLL Semifinals at PAETEC Park on August 25, 2007.  The Barrage won their 3rd MLL Championship by defeating the Riptide 16-13 in the MLL Championship Game at PAETEC Park on August 26, 2007.

Schedule

Playoffs

Major League Lacrosse seasons
Philadelphia Barrage Season, 2007
Lacrosse in Pennsylvania
2007 in sports in Pennsylvania